"Even If It Breaks Your Heart" is a song written by Will Hoge and Eric Paslay in April 2009 and originally recorded by Hoge on his seventh studio album, The Wreckage. The song was made popular by American country music group the Eli Young Band. It was released in January 2012 as the sixth single of their career, and the second from their album Life at Best.

Critical reception
Billy Dukes of Taste of Country gave the song four stars out of five, saying that it is "poetry set to music" but the lyrics are "difficult to relate to." Jonathan Keefe of Country Universe wrote that it's a "good but not great song, given a credible performance by a competent band with the wherewithal not to want to sound like Journey" but "precious few guitar chords in the full duration of the performance actually ring to the full breadth of their tone, giving the single a clipped, tinny sound." He gave the song a B but the recording itself a D.

Music video
The music video was directed by Brian Lazzaro and premiered in January 2012.

Chart performance
"Even If It Breaks Your Heart" debuted at number 60 on the U.S. Billboard Hot Country Songs chart for the week of December 24, 2011. It also debuted at number 91 on the U.S. Billboard Hot 100 chart for the week of March 31, 2012. The song became the group's second consecutive number-one single on the country chart for the week of July 28, 2012.

Charts and certifications

Weekly charts

Certifications

Year-end charts

References

2012 singles
Eli Young Band songs
Republic Records singles
Songs written by Eric Paslay
Song recordings produced by Frank Liddell
Republic Nashville singles
2011 songs
Songs written by Will Hoge